Apollo Goes on Holiday is a 1968 Greek comedy film directed by Giorgos Skalenakis.

Cast 
 Elena Nathanael - Elena
 Thomas Fritsch - Prince Jan
 Athinodoros Prousalis - Manolis
 Christos Tsaganeas - Ambassador
 Caroline Christensen - Nora
 Giorgos Bartis - Photographer
 Aris Maliagros - Baron
 Ulla Bergryd - Tourist

References

External links 

1968 comedy films
Greek comedy films
1960s Greek-language films